Edwin Oliver James (1888 – 1972) was an anthropologist in the field of comparative religion. He was Professor Emeritus of the History and Philosophy of Religion in the University of London, Fellow of University College London and Fellow of King's College London. During his long career he had been Professor of History and Philosophy of Religion at the University of Leeds, Lecturer at the University of Amsterdam and Wilde Lecturer at the University of Oxford.

James received his education at Exeter College, Oxford and at University College London, where he studied under the noted egyptologist Sir William Matthew Flinders Petrie.

James was also a member of the Folklore Society, serving as its President from 1930 to 1932.

Works

Evolution and the Fall (1923)
The Beginnings of Man (1928)
The Christian Faith in the Modern World. A Study in Scientific Theology.
A History of Christianity in England
Christian Myth And Ritual: A Historical Study (1933)
Origins of Sacrifice: A Study in Comparative Religion (1933)
Thieves of Mercy (1934) poems
The Old Testament in the Light of Anthropology (1935)
The Origins of Religion (1937)
Comparative Religion: An Introductory and Historical Study (1938)
Primitive Belief and Ritual
The Social Function of Religion (1948)
The Concept of Deity. The Wilde Lectures (1950)
Marriage and Society (1952)
History of Religions (1956)
Prehistoric Religion: A Study in Prehistoric Archaeology. (1957)
Myths and Ritual in the Ancient Near East (1958)
The Beginnings of Religion: An Introductory & Scientific Study (1958)
The Cult of the Mother Goddess: An Archaeological and Documentary Study (1959)
The Comparative Study of Religions of the East (Excluding Christianity and Judaism).
The Ancient Gods: The History and Diffusion of Religion in the Ancient Near East and the Eastern Mediterranean (1960)
Nature and Function of Priesthood: A Comparative and Anthropological Study (1961)
Seasonal Feasts and Festivals (1961)
Sacrifice and Sacrament (1962)
The Worship of the Sky-God, A Comparative Study in Semitic and Indo-European Religion (1963)
Marriage Customs Through the Ages (1965)
From Cave to Cathedral : Temples and Shrines of Prehistoric, Classical and Early Christian Times (1965)
The Tree of Life: An Archaeological Study (1966)
Christianity and other religions (1968)
Creation and Cosmology: a historical and comparative inquiry (1969)

References

External links
A memoir of EO James, by David Brown

1888 births
1972 deaths
Alumni of Exeter College, Oxford
Alumni of University College London
Academics of University College London
Academics of the University of Leeds
Academics of King's College London
Fellows of King's College London
British anthropologists
British historians of religion
Anthropologists of religion
Anthropology educators
British theologians
Anthropology writers
20th-century English historians
20th-century anthropologists
Presidents of the Folklore Society
Scholars of comparative religion